Faith Cherotich (born 13 July 2004) is a Kenyan athlete who specializes in the 3000 metres steeplechase. At the age of 17, she won the bronze medal at the 2021 World Athletics Under-20 Championships held in Nairobi. Cherotich upgraded her bronze to gold a year later, winning the title at the World U20 Championships in Cali.

References

External links

2004 births
Living people
Kenyan female steeplechase runners
World Athletics U20 Championships winners